Idrettsforeningen Fram, better known as Fram Larvik to distinguish it from other sport clubs, is a sports club from Torstrand in Larvik, Norway. It has sections for association football, athletics, handball and speed skating.

General history
The club was founded on 15 January 1894. That makes Fram Norway's oldest existing association football club. It is often known as Fram Larvik, mainly to distinguish it from IL Fram from Skatval.

Football
The men's football team currently plays in the Norwegian Second Division, the third tier of the Norwegian football league system.

The club reached the final of the 1912 Norwegian Cup. Fram won the final 2–1, but the opponent Mercantile claimed that Fram had used an illegit player. The Norwegian FA ruled a replay the next weekend. On 20 October 1912, Fram lost the replay 0–6 against Mercantile at Gamle Frogner Stadion in Kristiania. The club's greatest achievement came in 1950, when the club won the 1949–50 Hovedserien, the Norwegian top division. Fram played in the Second Division to 1995, but was down to the 4. divisjon for a period after relegation in the 1999 3. divisjon campaign. After that, the team was remade to Larvik Fotball, which won several promotions and resided in the 2. divisjon for some years. The cooperation club Larvik Fotball ceased to exist in late 2004, and the 2005 2. divisjon was played as IF Fram, but with abysmal results. After a few seasons back in the 3. divisjon, however, Fram won the league in 2008 and the subsequent playoffs, and has played in the 2. divisjon since. Petter Belsvik took over as head coach after the 2013 season from Tom Helge Jacobsen. In 2021 Haakon Lunov is head coach of Fram Football arter signing a two-year contract.

Notable footballers include Tom Rüsz Jacobsen, Kenneth Stenild, Lars Bakkerud, Freddy Ørbeck Jonny Hansen and Sverre Hansen.

Honours 

Norwegian top flight: 
Winners (1): 1949–50
Norwegian Football Cup: 
Runners-up (1): 1912

Recent seasons
{|class="wikitable"
|-bgcolor="#efefef"
! Season
! Division
! Pos.
! Pl.
! W
! D
! L
! GS
! GA
! P
!Cup
!Notes
|-
|2005
|2. divisjon
|align=right bgcolor="#FFCCCC"| 14
|align=right|26||align=right|4||align=right|5||align=right|17
|align=right|25||align=right|90||align=right|17
|Second round
|Relegated
|-
|2006
|3. divisjon
|align=right|8
|align=right|22||align=right|7||align=right|7||align=right|8
|align=right|53||align=right|39||align=right|28
|First qualifying round
|
|-
|2007
|3. divisjon
|align=right|1
|align=right|22||align=right|14||align=right|4||align=right|4
|align=right|66||align=right|28||align=right|46
|First qualifying round
|Lost promotion play-off
|-
|2008
|3. divisjon
|align=right bgcolor="#ddffdd"| 1
|align=right|22||align=right|20||align=right|1||align=right|1
|align=right|75||align=right|22||align=right|61
|Second round
|Won promotion play-off
|-
|2009
|2. divisjon
|align=right |8
|align=right|26||align=right|10||align=right|3||align=right|13
|align=right|47||align=right|69||align=right|33
|First round
|
|-
|2010
|2. divisjon
|align=right |11
|align=right|26||align=right|9||align=right|6||align=right|11
|align=right|45||align=right|53||align=right|33
|First round
|
|-
|2011 
|2. divisjon
|align=right |11
|align=right|26||align=right|7||align=right|6||align=right|13
|align=right|34||align=right|56||align=right|38
|First round 
|
|-
|2012
|2. divisjon
|align=right |6
|align=right|26||align=right|10||align=right|6||align=right|10
|align=right|39||align=right|37||align=right|36
|First round 
|
|-
|2013
|2. divisjon
|align=right |3
|align=right|26||align=right|14||align=right|8||align=right|4
|align=right|62||align=right|34||align=right|50
|First round
|
|-
|2014
|2. divisjon
|align=right |3
|align=right|26||align=right|15||align=right|4||align=right|7
|align=right|52||align=right|41||align=right|49
|Second round
|
|-
|2015
|2. divisjon
|align=right |4
|align=right|26||align=right|13||align=right|8||align=right|5
|align=right|60||align=right|42||align=right|47
|Second round 
|
|-
|2016
|2. divisjon
|align=right |6
|align=right|26||align=right|13||align=right|2||align=right|11
|align=right|58||align=right|46||align=right|41
|Second round
|
|-
|2017 
|2. divisjon
|align=right |5
|align=right|26||align=right|12||align=right|6||align=right|8
|align=right|49||align=right|43||align=right|42
|First round
|
|-
|2018 
|2. divisjon
|align=right |10
|align=right|26||align=right|9||align=right|2||align=right|15
|align=right|40||align=right|57||align=right|29
|Second round
|
|-
|2019 
|2. divisjon
|align=right |5
|align=right|26||align=right|12||align=right|7||align=right|7
|align=right|50||align=right|34||align=right|43
|Quarterfinal
|
|-
|2020 
|2. divisjon
|align=right |14
|align=right|13||align=right|1||align=right|3||align=right|9
|align=right|17||align=right|41||align=right|6
|Cancelled
|
|-
|2021
|2. divisjon
|align=right bgcolor="#FFCCCC"| 12
|align=right|26||align=right|6||align=right|9||align=right|11
|align=right|33||align=right|42||align=right|27
|Second round
|Relegated
|-
|2022
|3. divisjon
|align=right bgcolor="#DDFFDD"| 1
|align=right|26||align=right|18||align=right|7||align=right|1
|align=right|60||align=right|20||align=right|61
|Second round
|Promoted
|}
Source:

Handball
The club also have a handball team, that plays in the First Division, the second highest tier in men's handball. Ole Kristian Strøm is the coach, and they play their matches in Framhallen.

Notable handballers include Eivind Ellingsen, Pål Myrdam, Are Ruud and Tom Bakke.

Speed skating
Notable speed skaters in Fram include Bjørg Eva Jensen, Tom Erik Oxholm, Roger Strøm, Else Marie Christiansen, Minna Nystedt, Anne Therese Tveter, Bjørn Tveter and Øyvind Tveter.

References

External links
Official website
Framparken on Nordic Stadiums

 
Norwegian handball clubs
Athletics clubs in Norway
Sport in Vestfold og Telemark
IF Fram Larvik
Association football clubs established in 1894
Football clubs in Norway
Multi-sport clubs in Norway